Client-side decoration (CSD) is the concept of allowing a graphical application software to be responsible for drawing its own window decorations, historically the responsibility of the window manager.

Sometimes client-side decoration is used to refer to the applications that don't have a traditional title bar. However, this is a misuse of the phrase, as even applications that have a basic title bar can be client side decorated.

By using client-side decoration rather than traditional server-side decoration, applications are able to draw their own title bar, which allows for a wide range of possibilities to customize window decorations and add additional functionality (graphical control elements) into what otherwise would be a typical window manager bar with much empty space in the maximized windows.

Terminology 
In Linux and Unix-like systems, it is called Client-Side Decoration which comes from X Window System, where a client is the application which renders a window and sends it to the X server. The alternative is called Server-Side Decoration (SSD) even though on X the decoration is drawn by the window manager, which is not actually the "server".

Implementations

Widget toolkits

GTK 
GTK was the first GUI toolkit on Linux that implemented client-side decoration using the GtkHeaderBar widget.

GtkHeaderBar merges the title bar, menu bar and tool bar into one unified horizontal bar in order to give more space to the application content, potentially reducing the amount of wasted space by showing empty bars. This can help to achieve a flexible UI and consistent UX across different computer form factors from desktop systems to small form factor devices by removing the traditional desktop-oriented parts from applications. These have first-class support in GNOME Shell and are widely used by GNOME applications.

UWP 
Universal Windows Platform applications can choose to draw their own title bars.

macOS 
In macOS, AppKit applications use client-side decoration when using the NSWindow widget.

Electron 
Electron has the option to use a frame-less window (without toolbar, menu bar, tabs), however the application is responsible for drawing its own shadows.

Deepin Tool Kit 

Deepin Tool Kit is a small modified widget toolkit based on Qt5, it is used by Deepin Desktop Environment.

Applications 
Notable applications with client-side decoration:

 Steam, uses its own widget toolkit called "VGUI".
 Firefox uses client-side decorations when the title bar is disabled.
 Google Chrome and other Chromium based browsers use client-side decorations on Windows and macOS, and support both client and server decorations on Linux.

Display servers

Wayland 
Wayland was designed to have client-side decorations (including the shadows of windows) by default, but has an optional protocol, known as xdg-decoration, which allows an application (client) to query whether the window manager supports server-side decoration and if so for a client to request it. Mutter, the compositor used by GNOME Shell, under Wayland only supports client side decoration, whilst KWin supports both client and server side decoration.

History 
 In 2008 Adobe released Photoshop CS4 that uses client-side decorations.
 In 2012 Microsoft uses client-side decorations in their new Metro design language by adding toolbar objects like back buttons to the windows title bar.
 In 2013 GTK added support for client-side decorations with the release of GTK 3.10.

See also 
 Ribbon (computing)
 Window decoration

References

External links 
 Client-Side Decorations Initiative
 GtkHeaderBar: GTK3 Reference Manual

Graphical control elements
Graphical user interface elements